This article documents the chronology of the response to the COVID-19 pandemic in October 2022, which originated in Wuhan, China in December 2019. Some developments may become known or fully understood only in retrospect. Reporting on this pandemic began in December 2019.

Reactions and measures in the United Nations

Reactions and measures in Africa

Reactions and measures in the Americas

Reactions and measures in the Eastern Mediterranean

Reactions and measures in Europe

Reactions and measures in South, East and Southeast Asia

1 October 
China – China puts the city of Shenzhen on lockdown.

5 October 
China – China bans residents from leaving Xinjiang.

Reactions and measures in the Western Pacific

18 October
The New Zealand Government eliminated several of its COVID-19 emergency powers including its powers to implement lockdowns, managed isolation and quarantine (MIQ), border closures, vaccine passes and mandates. The Government however opted to retain the Act's provisions for seven-day isolation periods, mask use and border entry requirements until Parliament passed newer, general pandemic legislation. In addition, the Government revoked the Epidemic Notice, signalling a shift from emergency management to long-term management of COVID-19.
New Zealand's COVID-19 Response Minister Chris Hipkins announced that the Government would hold a royal commission into its response to the COVID-19 pandemic.

See also 

 Timeline of the COVID-19 pandemic in October 2022
 Responses to the COVID-19 pandemic

References 

October 2022 events
Timelines of the COVID-19 pandemic in 2022
Responses to the COVID-19 pandemic in 2022